Auguste Perret (12 February 1874 – 25 February 1954) was a French architect and a pioneer of the architectural use of reinforced concrete. His major works include the Théâtre des Champs-Élysées, the first Art Deco building in Paris; the Church of Notre-Dame du Raincy (1922–23); the Mobilier National in Paris (1937); and the French Economic, Social and Environmental Council building in Paris (1937–39). After World War II he designed a group of buildings in the centre of the port city of Le Havre, including St. Joseph's Church, Le Havre, to replace buildings destroyed by bombing during World War II.  His reconstruction of the city is now a World Heritage Site for its exceptional urban planning and architecture.

Early life and experiments (1874–1912)
Auguste Perret was born in Ixelles, Belgium, where his father, a stonemason, had taken refuge after the Paris Commune.  He received his early education in architecture in the family firm.  He was accepted in the architecture course of the École des Beaux-Arts in Paris, along with his two brothers, Gustave (1876-1952) and Claude (1880-1960). where he studied under Julien Guadet, a Beaux Arts neoclassicist who had collaborated with Charles Garnier on the construction of the Paris Opera.  Beyond the neoclassical rationalism he learned from Gaudet, Perret's particular interest was the structure of buildings and the use of new materials, such as concrete. Though he was considered a brilliant student,  he left school without obtaining a diploma and went to work for the family firm. 

Perret immediately began experimenting with concrete.  His first important project was an apartment building on rue Franklin in Paris (1903), where the concrete structure, instead of being concealed, was clearly visible and was a part of the exterior design.  He made an even more radical experiment with the construction of a garage on rue de Ponthieu (1906)  (now destroyed) with a simplified cubic structure expressing the interior, large bays of windows and a lack of decoration, which resembled the later International Style.

Early works (1913–1939)

His most famous building was the Théâtre des Champs-Élysées a project which he took over from the Art Nouveau architect Henry van de Velde.  The facade was simple and decorated only with a sculptural bas-relief by Antoine Bourdelle.  The corner of the building was smooth and rounded, anticipating the Streamline Moderne style three decades later.  Thanks to the use of concrete pillars, the interior lobby and the theater itself was vast and open, unobstructed by columns.  The interior decoration featured works by the modernist artists of the day;  a dome by Maurice Denis, paintings by Édouard Vuillard and Jacqueline Marval, and a stage curtain by Ker-Xavier Roussel.

In his later works, Perret used concrete in imaginative ways to achieve the functions of his buildings, while preserving classical harmony, symmetry and proportions.  His major works included the building of the French Economic, Social and Environmental Council, originally built for the Museum of Public Works of the 1937 Paris Exposition;  and the Mobilier Nationale, the national government furniture atelier in Paris. He also created innovative industrial buildings, including a warehouse in Casablanca covered with a think veil of concrete (1915); the Perret Tower, the first concrete tower for the International Exhibition of Hydropower and Tourism of Grenoble (1925), to demonstrate his "Order of Concrete"; and the church of Notre Dame du Raincy (1922-23), where the interior columns were left undecorated and the concrete vaults of the ceiling became the most prominent decorative feature.  He experimented with concrete forms to achieve the best acoustics for the concert hall of the École Normale de Musique de Paris in Paris. (1929)

Later works (1945–1954)

In 1952 he completed construction of the Saclay Nuclear Research Centre in the Paris suburb of Essonne.  He described this campus as a "small Versailles for nuclear research".  Most of France's early nuclear reactors were constructed within the site.

His other major postwar projects included the reconstruction of the center of the port of Le Havre, which had been almost totally destroyed during the war.  His first plan was rejected as too ambitious, but his modified plans were followed. He also participated in the postwar reconstruction of the Marseille port and of Amiens. 

His last major work, finished after his death, was the St. Joseph's Church, Le Havre, (1951–58) whose most prominent feature is its tower, like a lighthouse, 107 meters high, and visible at sea.

Later life, honors and legacy

Among the many young architects who worked in the office of Perret from 1908 to 1910 was Charles-Édouard Jeanneret-Gris, who later became known as Le Corbusier; it was his first experience in an architectural firm.

From 1940 Perret taught at the École des Beaux-Arts.  He won the Royal Gold Medal in 1948 and the AIA Gold Medal in 1952. His work was also part of the architecture event in the art competition at the 1948 Summer Olympics.

Perret also served as a juror with Florence Meyer Blumenthal in awarding the Prix Blumenthal, a grant given between 1919 and 1954 to young French painters, sculptors, decorators, engravers, writers, and musicians.

In 1998, the Perret Tower in Grenoble was declared a national heritage site by France. 

In 2005, his reconstruction of Le Havre was declared a World Heritage Site by UNESCO.

List of major works 
 Rue Franklin apartments, Paris, 1902–1904
 Garage Ponthieu, Paris, 1907
 Théâtre des Champs-Élysées, Paris, 1913
 Concrete cathedral in Le Raincy, France, Église Notre-Dame du Raincy, 1923, with stained-glass work by Marguerite Huré
 Perret tower, Grenoble, 1925
 La maison-ateliers Chana Orloff, 7 bis villa Seurat, Paris, 1926. 
 Concert hall of the École Normale de Musique de Paris, 1929
 Hôtel Saint-Georges, Beirut, Lebanon 1932
 Immeuble Lange, 9 place de la Porte-de-Passy, Paris (1929-1932)
Services Techniques des Constructions Navales, 8 boulevard du General-Martial-Valin (15th arron.) Paris, 1929–1932; an example of a framework of exposed concrete columns. 
 Building, 51-55 rue Raynouard (16th arr.) Paris, (1932), where Perret had his offices
 Palais Iéna, Paris, 1937, originally built as the Museum of Public Works for the 1937 Paris Exposition, now home of the French Economic, Social and Environmental Council
 Extensions to the École nationale supérieure des Beaux-Arts, Paris, 1945
 City Hall, St. Joseph's Church and further reconstruction of the French city of Le Havre after more than 80,000 inhabitants of that city were left homeless following World War II, 1949–1956
 Restaurant #1 of CEA Paris-Saclay, 1952
 Gare d'Amiens, 1955
 Villa Aghion, in Alexandria (partial attempt to destroy, 28 August 2009. Destroyed completely by 21 January 2016)

See also
 Art Deco in Paris
 Architecture of Paris
 Paris architecture of the Belle Époque
 Art Deco

Notes

References
}

}

External links

 Flickr Pool with pictures
 List of realisations on Archiguide
 Auguste Perret on GreatBuildings.com
 Garage Ponthieu at Scholars Resource
 

1874 births
1954 deaths
People from Ixelles
20th-century French architects
Prix Blumenthal
École des Beaux-Arts alumni
Academic staff of the École des Beaux-Arts
Concrete pioneers
Burials at Montparnasse Cemetery
Recipients of the Royal Gold Medal
Members of the Académie des beaux-arts
Modernist architects from France
Olympic competitors in art competitions
Recipients of the AIA Gold Medal